Lower Grand Lagoon is a census-designated place (CDP) in Bay County, Florida, United States. The population was 3,881 at the 2010 census. It is part of the Panama City–Lynn Haven–Panama City Beach Metropolitan Statistical Area.

Geography
Lower Grand Lagoon is located at  (30.150784, -85.761490).

Demographics

As of the census of 2000, there were 4,082 people, 2,097 households, and 1,052 families residing in the CDP. The racial makeup of the CDP was 95.88% White, 1.18% African American, 0.59% Native American, 0.73% Asian, 0.07% Pacific Islander, 0.32% from other races, and 1.22% from two or more races. Hispanic or Latino of any race were 3.06% of the population.

There were 2,097 households, out of which 16.1% had children under the age of 18 living with them, 39.5% were married couples living together, 7.2% had a female householder with no husband present, and 49.8% were non-families. 37.3% of all households were made up of individuals, and 9.4% had someone living alone who was 65 years of age or older.  The average household size was 1.95 and the average family size was 2.50.

In the CDP, the population was spread out, with 13.4% under the age of 18, 9.4% from 18 to 24, 33.6% from 25 to 44, 25.7% from 45 to 64, and 18.0% who were 65 years of age or older.  The median age was 42 years. For every 100 females, there were 104.7 males.  For every 100 females age 18 and over, there were 107.1 males.

The median income for a household in the CDP was $31,599, and the median income for a family was $38,650. Males had a median income of $27,648 versus $21,905 for females. The per capita income for the CDP was $20,433.  About 13.3% of families and 16.3% of the population were below the poverty line, including 29.6% of those under age 18 and 6.8% of those age 65 or over.

References

Census-designated places in Bay County, Florida
Census-designated places in Florida
Populated coastal places in Florida on the Gulf of Mexico